The 2017 Folds of Honor QuikTrip 500 was a Monster Energy NASCAR Cup Series race held on March 5, 2017, at Atlanta Motor Speedway in Hampton, Georgia. Contested over 325 laps on the 1.54-mile-long (2.48 km) asphalt quad-oval intermediate speedway, it was the second race of the 2017 Monster Energy NASCAR Cup Series season, and the 2,500th race in the history of the Cup Series. The race was won by the #2 Ford Fusion driven by Brad Keselowski for Team Penske.

Report

Background

Atlanta Motor Speedway (formerly Atlanta International Raceway) is a track in Hampton, Georgia, 20 miles (32 km) south of Atlanta. It is a  quad-oval track with a seating capacity of 111,000. It opened in 1960 as a  standard oval. In 1994, 46 condominiums were built over the northeastern side of the track. In 1997, to standardize the track with Speedway Motorsports' other two  ovals, the entire track was almost completely rebuilt. The frontstretch and backstretch were swapped, and the configuration of the track was changed from oval to quad-oval. The project made the track one of the fastest on the NASCAR circuit.

Entry list

First practice

Qualifying

He said in his last qualifying run, he "was able to carry more speed and do some things with the car that I wasn't able to do in the first two runs. At that point I just didn't want to screw it up, because I felt like I'd gotten to the green, which I didn't do in the second round. I got to the green good, I got through (Turns) 1 and 2 good. I just needed to hit the bottom and get that left front on the line so that it would hook and get up off the corner. That was by far the best of the three laps, and we saved it perfectly for the end."

Derrike Cope, Jeffrey Earnhardt, Michael McDowell, Cody Ware and Cole Whitt failed to post a timed lap because their cars didn't pass pre-qualifying inspection in time. This was a result of new procedures that require cars that fail any station of inspection to return to the garage to make adjustments.

Qualifying results

Final practice

Race

Stage 1
Kevin Harvick led the field to the green flag at 2:48 p.m. Joey Logano and Jamie McMurray made contact exiting Turn 2, but both saved themselves from spinning and continued racing. A number of cars started pitting on lap 32. Harvick pitted on lap 38 and Ryan Newman took the lead. He pitted on lap 40 and the lead cycled back to Harvick. Dale Earnhardt Jr. and Matt Kenseth were given pass through penalty's for speeding on pit road.

Ryan Blaney made an unscheduled stop for a loose right-front wheel on lap 48. Earnhardt made an unscheduled stop on lap 71 for a shredded right-rear tire. Harvick won the first stage and the first caution of the race flew for the completion of the stage.

Stage 2
The race restarted on lap 94. Brad Keselowski made an unscheduled stop for a tire issue on lap 117. Two laps later, teammate Logano pitted. He was cited for speeding and served a pass through penalty. Keselowski un-lapped himself on lap 125 by passing Harvick on the high side in Turn 4. The next lap, another wave of green flag stops commenced. When Harvick pitted on lap 130, the lead cycled to Keselowski. Jimmie Johnson was given a pass through penalty for speeding on pit road.

Harvick powered by Keselowski on the backstretch to retake the lead on lap 143. Denny Hamlin made an unscheduled stop on lap 161 for a vibration. After pitting, he failed to get up to speed and reported that “something is broken.” He took his car to the garage and retired from the race with a track bar issue. Harvick won the second stage and the second caution flew on lap 171 for the end of the stage.

Final stage

The race restarted on lap 178. The next round of green flag pit stops started with 118 laps to go. Chase Elliott and Martin Truex Jr. were given pass through penalties for speeding.

Debris in Turn 4 brought out the third caution with 86 to go.

The race restarted with 80 to go. Gray Gaulding lost an engine in Turn 4, bringing out the fourth caution with 63 to go. Keselowski exited pit road first, but came back down pit road for a loose wheel, related to unsecure lug nuts, and Harvick assumed the lead once more.

The race restarted with 56 to go. Austin Dillon, restarting on the outside line, spun his tires and backed up the cars lined up on the outside. Clint Bowyer tagged the wall in Turn 1 and made contact with Erik Jones. With 47 to go, Bowyer suffered a left-front tire blowout and slammed the wall in Turn 1, bringing out the fifth caution. Newman, who was running fourth, was sent to the tail end of the field on the restart for a crew member being over the wall too soon when he pitted.

The race restarted with 42 to go. Two laps later, Newman came back down pit road, and subsequently went to the garage, for a battery issue. He returned to the race with 19 to go, but the same issue befell teammate Dillon with 17 to go. He was told not to pit and his car stalled on the apron in Turn 2, bringing out the sixth caution with 16 to go. Harvick exited pit road as the race leader, but was cited for speeding and sent to the tail end of the field on the restart. He said after the race that he "just made a mistake that I preach all the time that you don’t need to make – (don’t) beat yourself. Then you go out and make it yourself instead of following all the things you preach. That part is hard for me to swallow.” Kyle Larson inherited the lead.

The race restarted with 11 to go. Keselowski took second from Elliott on the restart and set his sights on Larson. With seven to go, they were side-by-side for the lead, with Keselowski emerging with the lead and scoring the victory.

Post-race

Driver comments
Keselowski said in victory lane that this victory "kind of fell in our lap at the end, and my team put it all together when it counted. They gave me a great Autotrader Ford Fusion, and we were able to get by Kyle there at the end. I knew that he wasn't going to be easy to pass. His car was great, and I was able to make the right moves to get by him."

After finishing fourth despite a poor handling car early on, Kasey Kahne said he thought in the first 50 laps '"[Oh] my god, this feels just like last year.' But then suddenly we figured out how to fix [the handling problems] and that was awesome."

Infractions
Post-race inspection revealed that A. J. Allmendinger's car had three insecure lug nuts. On the Wednesday after the race, he was docked 35 points, fined $65,000 and his crew chief Randall Burnett was suspended three races.

Race results

Stage results
Stage 1
Laps: 85

Stage 2
Laps: 85

Final stage results

Stage 3
Laps: 155

Race statistics
 Lead changes: 5 among different drivers
 Cautions/Laps: 6 for 32
 Red flags: 0
 Time of race: 3 hours, 33 minutes and 8 seconds
 Average speed:

Media

Television
The Folds of Honor QuikTrip 500 was carried by Fox in the United States. Mike Joy, five-time Atlanta winner Jeff Gordon and three-time Atlanta winner Darrell Waltrip worked the race from the booth. Pit road was manned by Jamie Little, Vince Welch and Matt Yocum.

Radio
The race was broadcast on radio by the Performance Racing Network and simulcast on Sirius XM NASCAR Radio. Doug Rice, Mark Garrow and Wendy Venturini called the race from the booth when the field raced down the front stretch. Rob Albright called the race from atop a billboard outside of turn 2 when the field raced through turns 1 and 2. Pat Patterson called the race from a billboard outside of turn 3 when the field raced through turns 3 and 4. On pit road, PRN was manned by Brad Gillie, Brett McMillan, Jim Noble and Doug Turnbull.

Standings after the race

Drivers' Championship standings

Manufacturers' Championship standings

Note: Only the first 16 positions are included for the driver standings.

References

2017 in sports in Georgia (U.S. state)
2017 Monster Energy NASCAR Cup Series
NASCAR races at Atlanta Motor Speedway
March 2017 sports events in the United States